Greil may refer to:

People
 Peter Greil, professor at University of Erlangen-Nuremberg

In fiction
 Greil, character in Fire Emblem: Path of Radiance